Donald Edward Rainsford (17 September 1937 – 31 August 1989) was an Australian rules footballer who played with Carlton in the Victorian Football League (VFL).

Family
The son of Claude Edward Rainsford (1905–1963) and Elsie Louisa Rainsford, née Smith (1909–1992), Donald Edward Rainsford and his twin brother Malcolm John Rainsford were born at Deloraine, Tasmania on 17 September 1937.

Death
Don Rainsford died of cancer aged 51 in 1989, leaving behind a widow and three children. A memorial plaque can be found at the Scottsdale Cemetery in Tasmania.

Notes

External links 

Don Rainsford's playing statistics from The VFA Project
Dons Rainsford's profile at Blueseum

1937 births
Australian rules footballers from Tasmania
Burnie Football Club players
Carlton Football Club players
Williamstown Football Club players
1989 deaths